Kyle Matthew Kuric (born August 25, 1989) is an American-Slovak professional basketball player for FC Barcelona of the Liga ACB and the EuroLeague. Kuric grew up in Evansville, Indiana, and graduated from Memorial High School in 2008.  Kuric is most noted for leading the Louisville Cardinals to a win in the last game Louisville played at Freedom Hall, and being named winner of the "2011 Papa John's Dunk of the Year". Kuric is of Slovak descent, and also has a Slovak passport.

High school
Kuric as a senior averaged 20.8 points, 6.7 rebounds, 1.8 steals and 1.3 blocked shots.  Kuric led a senior heavy Memorial team to the school's first sectional championship in 12 years.  Memorial was ranked number 1 in the 3A in Indiana for several weeks during the season.

Kuric was named the 2008 Evansville Courier & Press All-Metro Player of the Year, a second team AP all-state honoree and was ranked No. 147 in the ESPN 150 listing of the top players in the class of 2008. He was selected to the Indiana All-Star team in 2008. Following high school he signed a letter of intent to play for the University of Louisville Cardinals.

College career
Kuric saw little playing time his freshman year mainly playing behind Terrence Williams who was a lottery pick in the 2009 NBA draft.  Kuric's most notable game came as a sophomore during Louisville's final game held in Freedom Hall against the then No. 1 ranked Syracuse Orange.  He scored 22 points, all in the second half, to lead Louisville to the upset win.  Kuric added three rebounds, two assists, a steal, and four dunks while connecting on 9-of-11 field goals (4-of-6 three-pointers).  Pat Forde of ESPN called him the "unlikely hero" of that game.

Kuric ended his junior season as the 2nd leading scorer for a Louisville team that overachieved relative to expectations .  Preseason predictions had them 8th in the Big East Conference and they did not receive a single vote in the preseason top 25 poll nationally.  The Cardinals ended the season with a record of  25-10 and ranked number 11. They placed third in the Big East regular season and reached the final game of the Big East Conference tournament losing to UConn Huskies by 3 points. The Cardinals were seeded 4th in the NCAA tournament, but were upset in the first round by 13th seed Morehead State University.  Kuric came on strong in Big East Conference play by averaging a team-high 15.1 points and 5.8 rebounds over the last 13 games, hitting 34-of-74 three-pointers (.459) and 53.8 percent from the field.  He was third in the Big East in Three-point field goal percentage (.449, 70-of-156) and was seventh in field goal percentage(.514).

Kuric scored the winning layup on a pass from Preston Knowles with four seconds left to cap a 24-5 run against Marquette Golden Eagles in the last 5:44 of the game.  This game has been dubbed the "Miracle on Main Street".  Kuric was selected to the Big East Honor Roll on February  14 after averaging 25.5 points, 5.5 rebounds and hitting 62.1 percent from the field—including 9-of-14 three-point goals (.643) -- as Louisville split games against Notre Dame and Syracuse.

Kyle Kuric's monster slam dunk in the waning seconds of the first half at Notre Dame was voted as the "2011 Papa John's Dunk of the Year". Kuric's dunk received 45 percent of the votes in a Facebook fan poll to earn the national title. Kuric is also regarded as a fan favorite amongst die-hard Louisville basketball fans. On ranker.com, a site designed to encourage fan engagement, he's listed at #28 on all-time favorite Louisville players.

Kuric was selected a tri-captain of the 2011–12 University of Louisville Men's basketball team along with Peyton Siva and Chris Smith.  Kuric was the leading scorer during his senior season.  The Cardinals won the Big East tournament and Kuric was named to the Big East All-tournament team.   Louisville went to the Final Four after a comeback win over Florida in the Elite Eight game but lost to Kentucky in a highly anticipated national semifinal in New Orleans.

Kuric was crowned U of L's Homecoming King on October 9, 2010 at halftime of the Cards' homecoming football game vs. Memphis Tigers.  He is frequently called "King Kyle" because of this selection.

Kuric has some significant off-court accomplishments as well. He has been selected for the Dean's List and AD honor roll at U of L several times.  He also served as the student representative on the U of L Athletic Association Board of Directors, the governing body for the Cardinals' athletic department. He was honored as U of L's Most Outstanding Sophomore in April 2010.   During his senior year at Louisville, Kuric founded a charity to assist children in the Kentuckiana area.  Kyle's Korner for Kids in cooperation with the University of Louisville athletic department collected halloween costumes for the Home for the Innocents and toys for children hospitalized on Christmas at Kosairs Children's Hospital.

College honors
 4x Big East Men's Basketball Tournament (2009–2012)
 Big East All Tournament Team 2012 
 4x NCAA Tournament Appearance (2009–2012)
 Final Four 2012
2011 Dunk of the Year Winner 
2012 Capitol One Academic All District 2 Team

Professional career
After playing at Louisville, in the NCAA Division I, Kuric started his pro career in 2012, with the Spanish club Asefa Estudiantes, where he stayed for two seasons, until signing with Herbalife Gran Canaria on 31 July 2014.

Kuric played for the Phoenix Suns' summer team in the 2016 NBA Summer League in Las Vegas. He returned to Herbalife Gran Canaria for the 2016–17 season. Herbalife Gran Canaria won the season's curtain raiser competition, the 2016 Spanish Supercup in September, and Kuric was named the MVP of the tournament.

On July 5, 2017, Kuric signed a two-year deal with Russian club Zenit Saint Petersburg.

On July 18, 2018, Kuric signed a two-year deal with FC Barcelona Lassa of the Liga ACB and the EuroLeague after reached an agreement with Zenit Saint Petersburg. He averaged 9.4 points per game in EuroLeague in 2019-20. On July 7, 2020, Kuric officially renewed his contract with the Spanish club through 2023.

Career statistics

|-
| align="left" |  2012–13
| align="left" | CB Estudiantes
| Liga ACB
| 33 || 21.8 || .500 || .394 || .879 || 2.0 || .9 || .7 || .1 || 11.2
|-
| align="left" |  2013–14
| align="left" | CB Estudiantes
| Liga ACB
| 34 || 28.2 || .437 || .401 || .875 || 3.3 || 1.0 || 1.1 || .3 || 13.5
|-
| align="left" |  2014–15
| align="left" | Herbalife Gran Canaria
| Liga ACB
| 34 || 27.7 || .456 || .388 || .936 || 2.1 || 1.1 || 1.0 || .2 || 12.1
|-
| align="left" |  2014–15
| align="left" | Herbalife Gran Canaria
| EuroCup
| 24 || 26.8 || .506 || .462 || .853 || 2.5 || 1.5 || .9 || .3 || 13.8
|-
| align="left" |  2015–16
| align="left" | Herbalife Gran Canaria
| Liga ACB
| 10 || 16.0 || .482 || .375 || 1.000 || 2.1 || .3 || 1.0 || .1 || 7.9
|-
| align="left" |  2015–16
| align="left" | Herbalife Gran Canaria
| EuroCup
| 3 || 24.0 || .536 || .546 || .500 || 2.0 || 1.3 || .0 || .3 || 14.7
|-
| align="left" |  2016–17
| align="left" | Herbalife Gran Canaria
| Liga ACB
| 32 || 22.2 || .467 || .411 || .833 || 2.6 || .9 || .6 || .2 || 12.5
|-
| align="left" |  2016–17
| align="left" | Herbalife Gran Canaria
| EuroCup
| 16 || 23.4 || .507 || .500 || .878 || 3.0 || .8 || .9 || .1 || 15.1
|-
| align="left" |  2017–18
| align="left" | Zenit Saint Petersburg
| VTB United League
| 29 || 25.4 || .472 || .386 || .822 || 3.4 || 1.5 || .9 || .2 || 16.4
|-
| align="left" |  2017–18
| align="left" | Zenit Saint Petersburg
| EuroCup
| 19 || 24.7 || .452 || .433 || .877 || 3.5 || 1.4 || .5 || .2 || 15.3
|-
| align="left" | 2018–19
| align="left" | FC Barcelona Bàsquet
| Liga ACB
| 30 || 21.0 || .455 || .414 || .889 || 2.1 || .8 || .8 || .1 || 9.4
|-
| align="left" |  2018–19
| align="left" | FC Barcelona Bàsquet
| EuroLeague
| 34 || 19.7 || .442 || .397 || .865 || 2.2 || .8 || .8 || .1 || 8.4
|-
| align="left" |  2019–20
| align="left" | FC Barcelona Bàsquet
| Liga ACB
| 23 || 20.7 || .412 || .353 || .902 || 2.2 || 1.2 || .9 || .1 || 8.4
|-
| align="left" |  2019–20
| align="left" | FC Barcelona Bàsquet
| EuroLeague
| 27 || 19.4 || .471 || .443 || .892 || 2.1 || .9 || .7 || .2 || 9.4
|-
| align="left" |  2020–21
| align="left" | FC Barcelona Bàsquet
| Liga ACB
| 40 || 18.6 || .524 || .458 || .906 || 1.7 || .6 || .5 || .1 || 9.0
|-
| align="left" |  2020–21
| align="left" | FC Barcelona Bàsquet
| EuroLeague
| 39 || 18.8 || .558 || .562 || .961 || 1.6 || .5 || .4 || .1 || 8.7
|-
|-class=sortbottom
| align="center" colspan=2 | Career
| All Leagues
| 427 || 22.4 || .475 || .425 || .877 || 2.4 || .9 || .7 || .2 || 11.3

Personal life
Kuric was born in Pennsylvania, but grew up in Evansville, Indiana. He has one sister, Katie, who was a goalkeeper on the women's soccer team at the University of Louisville. Kuric's father is a neurosurgeon, and his mother is a nurse practitioner. Kuric married Taraneh Momeni Kuric on July 5, 2013. He is the father of twin sons and a daughter.

On 5 November 2015, Kuric had surgery to remove brain tumors that were diagnosed two days before. He eventually underwent two additional surgeries to control brain swelling and to place a skull implant. He made a much anticipated return to the court five months after surgery making 3 of 4 three point shots in his first game back at Gran Canaria.  

On 7 September 2020, Kuric underwent surgical procedure to replace the cranial plate implanted in 2015.  The plate had cracked as a result of a collision in practice.  He returned to practice with FC Barcelona in October 2020.

References

External links
Kyle Kuric at acb.com 
Kyle Kuric @ eurocupbasketball.com
Kyle Kuric @acb.com 
Kyle Kuric @ eurobasket.com
Louisville Cardinals bio
2010–11 Basketball Information
 Kyle's Korner for Kids

1989 births
Living people
American expatriate basketball people in Russia
American expatriate basketball people in Spain
American men's basketball players
American people of Slovak descent
Basketball players from Indiana
BC Zenit Saint Petersburg players
CB Estudiantes players
CB Gran Canaria players
FC Barcelona Bàsquet players
Liga ACB players
Louisville Cardinals men's basketball players
Shooting guards
Slovak expatriate basketball people in Russia
Slovak expatriate basketball people in Spain
Slovak men's basketball players
Small forwards
Sportspeople from Evansville, Indiana